The Nashville Sound originated during the mid-1950s as a subgenre of American country music, replacing the chart dominance of the rough honky tonk music, which was most popular in the 1940s and 1950s, with "smooth strings and choruses", "sophisticated background vocals" and "smooth tempos" associated with traditional pop. It was an attempt "to revive country sales, which had been devastated by the rise of rock 'n' roll" as a distinct genre from the rockabilly spawned from it.

Origins
The Nashville Sound was pioneered by staff at RCA Victor, Columbia Records and Decca Records in Nashville, Tennessee. RCA Victor manager, producer and musician Chet Atkins, and producers Steve Sholes, Owen Bradley and Bob Ferguson, and recording engineer Bill Porter invented the form by replacing elements of the popular honky tonk style (fiddles, steel guitar, nasal lead vocals) with "smooth" elements from 1950s pop music (string sections, background vocals, crooning lead vocals), and using "slick" production, and pop music structures. The producers relied on a small group of studio musicians known as the Nashville A-Team, whose quick adaptability and creative input made them vital to the hit-making process. The Anita Kerr Quartet was the main vocal backing group in the early 1960s. In 1960, Time reported that Nashville had "nosed out Hollywood as the nation's second biggest (after New York) record-producing center."

The term "Nashville Sound" was first mentioned in an article about Jim Reeves in 1958 in the Music Reporter and again in 1960 in a TIME article about Reeves. Other observers have identified several recordings that helped establish the early Nashville Sound. Country historian Rich Kienzle says that "Gone", a Ferlin Husky hit recorded in November 1956, "may well have pointed the way to the Nashville Sound."  Writer Colin Escott proclaims Reeves' "Four Walls", recorded February 1957, to be the "first 'Nashville sound' record", and Chet Atkins, the RCA Victor producer and guitarist most often credited with being the sound's primary artistic creator, pointed to his production of Don Gibson's "Oh Lonesome Me" later the same year.

In an essay published in Heartaches by the Number: Country Music's 500 Greatest Singles, David Cantwell argues that Elvis Presley's rock and roll recording of "Don't Be Cruel" in July 1956 was the record that sparked the beginning of the era now called the Nashville Sound. Cantwell, however, does not factor in earlier Nashville recordings using vocal choruses or the fact that Presley's recordings were not marketed as country.

Regarding the Nashville Sound, the record producer Owen Bradley stated 

Quonset Hut Studio, RCA Studio B and later RCA Studio A, located directly center of Music Row, were considered pivotal as well as essential locations to the development of the Nashville Sound musical techniques. RCA Studio A specifically was designed and built to incorporate these techniques and was designed by RCA's sound engineer John E. Volkmann.

Countrypolitan

In the early 1960s, the Nashville Sound began to be challenged by the rival Bakersfield sound on the country side and by the British Invasion on the pop side; compounding these problems were the sudden deaths, in separate airplane crashes, of Patsy Cline and Jim Reeves, two of the Nashville Sound's biggest stars. Nashville's pop song structure became more pronounced, and it morphed into what was called Countrypolitan: a smoother sound typified through the use of lush string arrangements with a real orchestra and often background vocals provided by a choir. Countrypolitan was aimed straight at mainstream markets, and its music sold well through the later 1960s into the mid-1970s. Among the architects of this sound were producers Billy Sherrill (who was instrumental in shaping Tammy Wynette's early career) and Glenn Sutton. Artists who typified the countrypolitan sound initially included Wynette, Charlie Rich, and Charley Pride, along with Los Angeles-based singers Lynn Anderson and Glen Campbell. George Jones's style of the era successfully fused the countrypolitan sound with the honky-tonk style that had made him famous.

The Bakersfield sound, and later outlaw country, dominated country music among aficionados while countrypolitan reigned on the pop charts.

Upon being asked what the Nashville Sound was, Chet Atkins put his hand into his pocket, shook his loose change, and said "That's what it is. It's the sound of money".

Country pop

By the late 1970s and 1980s, many pop music singers picked up the countrypolitan style and created what is known as country pop, the fusion of country music and pop music.

See also
The Nashville A-Team
Nashville Sounds, a baseball team that borrows its name from the style
Schlager music, the category under which much of Nashville country falls in Europe

References

Country music genres
Pop music genres
Nashville, Tennessee
Music of Tennessee
Music scenes